This is a list of films which placed number-one at the weekend box office in Australia during 2001. Amounts are in Australian dollars. 

N/A denotes information that is not available from Urban Cinefile nor Movie Marshal.

See also 
 List of Australian films — Australian films by year

References

2001
Australia
2001 in Australian cinema